Diego Cristiano Evaristo (born 1 August 1992), known as Diego Pituca or simply Pituca, is a Brazilian footballer who plays for Japanese club Kashima Antlers. Mainly a defensive midfielder, he can also play as a left back.

Club career

Early career
Pituca was born in Mogi Guaçu, São Paulo, and mainly represented Guaçuano and Itapirense as a youth. In 2011 he joined Mineiros, but failed to appear for the side during his spell.

In 2011 Pituca returned to his native state, after agreeing to a contract with Brasilis. He made his debut for the club on 7 May of that year by starting in a 1–0 Campeonato Paulista Segunda Divisão away loss against his first club Guaçuano, and played his first campaign as a left back.

On 11 January 2012, after being a regular starter for Brasilis, Pituca moved back to Mandi. He only scored his first senior goal on 3 March of the following year, in a 2–2 home draw against Sertãozinho; thirteen days later, however, he netted a brace in a 4–1 home routing of Marília.

After two seasons as a starter, Pituca joined Matonense in April 2013. On 28 May 2014, he was loaned to União São João until the end of the year's Paulistão Segunda Divisão.

Botafogo-SP
Upon returning to Matonense, Pituca impressed enough for the side to secure a loan deal to Botafogo on 19 May 2015, despite being relegated with his previous club. He immediately became a starter at the side, helping in their Campeonato Brasileiro Série D winning campaign and remaining a mainstay afterwards; on 17 November 2016, he renewed his contract until the end of 2018.

Santos

On 29 May 2017 Pituca joined Santos, being initially assigned to the B-team. The following 24 January, he was promoted to the first team by new manager Jair Ventura.

Pituca made his first team – and Série A – debut on 14 April 2018, replacing Jean Mota in a 2–0 home win against Ceará. He made his Copa Libertadores debut on 24 May, starting in a 0–0 home draw against Real Garcilaso.

Pituca scored his first senior goal for Peixe on 23 September 2018, netting the opener in a 1–1 home draw against Vasco da Gama. Under new manager Cuca, he became an undisputed starter and finished the campaign with 34 league appearances.

On 3 May 2019, Pituca renewed his contract until April 2023. He remained a regular under subsequent managers Jorge Sampaoli and Jesualdo Ferreira, playing in a more advanced midfield role with the latter.

On 10 November 2020, it was announced that Pituca and a further six first team players tested positive for COVID-19.

Kashima Antlers
On 15 January 2021, Santos president Andrés Rueda announced the sale of Pituca to Japanese club Kashima Antlers. Antlers confirmed the transfer six days later, with Pituca joining the club after the 2020 Copa Libertadores Final.

Despite the J1 League season beginning in February, due to the COVID-19 pandemic Pituca was only allowed to enter Japan on April 2 and had to isolate for 14 days on arrival. He eventually made his debut in the J.League Cup, coming on as a substitute in a 2–2 draw with Sagan Tosu. He scored his first goal for Kashima in a 4-0 J1 League win over Consadole Sapporo. He went on to make 37 appearances across all competitions in his debut season, scoring 2 goals.

Career statistics

Club
.

Honours

Club
Matonense
Campeonato Paulista Segunda Divisão: 2013

Botafogo-SP
Campeonato Brasileiro Série D: 2015

Individual
Campeonato Paulista Team of the Year: 2019

References

External links

1992 births
Living people
Footballers from São Paulo (state)
Brazilian footballers
Association football midfielders
Campeonato Brasileiro Série A players
Campeonato Brasileiro Série C players
Campeonato Brasileiro Série D players
Mineiros Esporte Clube players
Sociedade Esportiva Matonense players
União São João Esporte Clube players
Botafogo Futebol Clube (SP) players
Santos FC players
Kashima Antlers players
Brazilian expatriate footballers
Brazilian expatriate sportspeople in Japan
Expatriate footballers in Japan
People from Mogi Guaçu